Electra is a genus of bryozoans belonging to the family Electridae.

The genus has cosmopolitan distribution.

Species:
 Electra arcuata (Canu, 1908) 
 Electra asiatica Grischenko, Dick & Mawatari, 2007 
Electra pilosa 
Electra posidoniae

References

Cheilostomatida
Bryozoan genera